Eupilocera is a monotypic snout moth genus. It was described by Paul Dognin in 1909, and contains the species Eupilocera gravidalis. It is found in French Guiana.

References

Chrysauginae
Monotypic moth genera
Moths described in 1909
Moths of South America
Pyralidae genera